Kinsbourne Green is a small hamlet to the north-west of Harpenden in Hertfordshire, England. The hamlet is now geographically virtually contiguous with Harpenden.   Kinsbourne Green is in the civil parish of Harpenden Rural (where at the 2011 Census the population was included).

References

External links

Hamlets in Hertfordshire
City of St Albans